born February 28, 1942 is a former member of the Supreme Court of Japan.

References

Supreme Court of Japan justices
1942 births
Living people